SAOUHSCs221 is a 108nt bacterial antisense RNA found by RNA-seq analysis in Staphylococcus aureus strain HG003 grown in rich medium, strain  JKD60008  and strain NCTC8325.

SAOUHSCs221 is expressed antisense to the IS200 transposase sequence, at the level of the 5’UTR sequence of the transposase ORF. Construction of this family only identified homologues in Firmicutes. However a small RNA named art200 (antisense regulator of transposase IS200) was also described E. coli and S. enterica (enterobacteria).

References

External links
 

Non-coding RNA